Maraveh Tappeh Rural District is a rural district (dehestan) in the Central District of Maraveh Tappeh County, Golestan Province, Iran. At the 2006 census, its population was 23,274, in 4,497 families.  The rural district has 56 villages.

References 

Rural Districts of Golestan Province
Maraveh Tappeh County